Robert Bresson (25 September 1901 – 18 December 1999) was a French film director.

Known for his ascetic approach, Bresson contributed notably to the art of cinema; his non-professional actors, ellipses, and sparse use of scoring have led his works to be regarded as preeminent examples of minimalist film. Much of his work is known for being tragic in story and nature.

Bresson is among the most highly regarded filmmakers of all time. He has the highest number of films (seven) that made the 2012 Sight & Sound critics' poll of the 250 greatest films ever made. His works A Man Escaped (1956), Pickpocket (1959) and Au Hasard Balthazar (1966) were ranked among the top 100, and other films like Mouchette (1967) and L'Argent (1983) also received many votes. Jean-Luc Godard once wrote, "He is the French cinema, as Dostoevsky is the Russian novel and Mozart is German music."

Life and career
Bresson was born at Bromont-Lamothe, Puy-de-Dôme, the son of Marie-Élisabeth (née Clausels) and Léon Bresson. Little is known of his early life. He was educated at Lycée Lakanal in Sceaux, Hauts-de-Seine, close to Paris, and turned to painting after graduating. Three formative influences in his early life seem to have made a mark on his films: Catholicism, art and his experiences as a prisoner of war. Robert Bresson lived in Paris, France, in the Île Saint-Louis.

Initially also a photographer, Bresson made his first short film, Les affaires publiques (Public Affairs) in 1934. During World War II, he spent over a year in a prisoner-of-war camp−an experience which informs Un condamné à mort s'est échappé ou Le vent souffle où il veut (A Man Escaped). In a career that spanned fifty years, Bresson made only 13 feature-length films. This reflects his painstaking approach to the filmmaking process and his non-commercial preoccupations. Difficulty finding funding for his projects was also a factor.

Although many writers claim that Bresson described himself as a "Christian atheist", no source ever confirmed this assertion, neither are the circumstances clear under which Bresson would have said it. On the contrary, in an interview in 1973 he said,

Furthermore, in a 1983 interview for TSR's Spécial Cinéma, Bresson declared that he had been interested in making a film based on the Book of Genesis, although he believed such a production would be too costly and time-consuming.

Bresson was sometimes accused of an "ivory tower existence". Critic Jonathan Rosenbaum, an admirer of Bresson's work, argued that the filmmaker was "a mysterious, aloof figure", and wrote that on the set of Four Nights of a Dreamer (1971) the director "seemed more isolated from his crew than any other filmmaker I've seen at work; his widow and onetime assistant director, Mylene van der Mersch, often conveyed his instructions."

Bresson died on a Saturday in December 1999, at his home in Droue-sur-Drouette southwest of Paris. He was 98. He made his last film, L'Argent, in 1983 and had been unwell for some time.

Themes and style
Bresson's early artistic focus was to separate the language of cinema from that of the theater, which often relies heavily upon the actor's performance to drive the work. Film scholar Tony Pipolo writes that "Bresson opposed not just professional actors, but acting itself," preferring to think of his actors as 'models'. In Notes on the Cinematographer (original French title: Notes sur le cinématographe; also published in English as Notes on the Cinematograph), a collection of aphorisms written by Bresson, the director succinctly defines the difference between the two:

HUMAN MODELS: movement from the exterior to the interior. [...]
ACTORS: movement from the interior to the exterior.

Bresson further elaborates on his disdain for acting by appropriating a remark Chateaubriand had made about 19th century poets and applying it to actors: "what they lack is not naturalness, but Nature." For Bresson, "to think it's more natural for a movement to be made or a phrase to be said like this than like that" is "absurd", and "nothing rings more false in film [...] than the overstudied sentiments" of theater.

With his 'model' technique, Bresson's actors were required to repeat multiple takes of each scene until all semblances of 'performance' were stripped away, leaving a stark effect that registers as both subtle and raw. This, as well as Bresson's restraint in musical scoring, would have a significant influence on minimalist cinema. In the academic journal CrossCurrents, Shmuel Ben-gad wrote:

There is a credibility in Bresson's models: They are like people we meet in life, more or less opaque creatures who speak, move, and gesture [...] Acting, on the other hand, no matter how naturalistic, actively deforms or invents by putting an overlay or filter over the person, presenting a simplification of a human being and not allowing the camera to capture the actor's human depths. Thus what Bresson sees as the essence of filmic art, the achievement of the creative transformation involved in all art through the interplay of images of real things, is destroyed by the artifice of acting. For Bresson, then, acting is, like mood music and expressive camera work, just one more way of deforming reality or inventing that has to be avoided.

Film critic Roger Ebert wrote that Bresson's directorial style resulted in films "of great passion: Because the actors didn't act out the emotions, the audience could internalize them."

Some feel that Bresson's Catholic upbringing and belief system lie behind the thematic structures of most of his films. Recurring themes under this interpretation include salvation, redemption, defining and revealing the human soul, and metaphysical transcendence of a limiting and materialistic world. An example is A Man Escaped (1956), where a seemingly simple plot of a prisoner of war's escape can be read as a metaphor for the mysterious process of salvation.

Bresson's films are also critiques of French society and the wider world, with each revealing the director's sympathetic, if unsentimental, view of society's victims. That the main characters of Bresson's most contemporary films, The Devil, Probably (1977) and L'Argent (1983), reach similarly unsettling conclusions about life indicates the director's feelings towards the culpability of modern society in the dissolution of individuals. Of an earlier protagonist he said, "Mouchette offers evidence of misery and cruelty. She is found everywhere: wars, concentration camps, tortures, assassinations." Film historian Mark Cousins argues that "[i]f Bergman and Fellini filmed life as if it was a theatre and a circus, respectively, Bresson's microcosm was that of a prison", describing Bresson's characters as "psychologically imprisoned".

Bresson published Notes on the Cinematographer in 1975, in which he argues for a unique sense of the term "cinematography". For him, cinematography is the higher function of cinema. While a movie is in essence "only" filmed theatre, cinematography is an attempt to create a new language of moving images and sounds.

Legacy
Bresson is often referred to as a "patron saint" of cinema, not only for the strong Catholic themes found throughout his oeuvre, but also for his notable contributions to the art of film. His style can be detected through his use of sound, associating selected sounds with images or characters; paring dramatic form to its essentials by the spare use of music; and through his infamous 'actor-model' methods of directing his almost exclusively non-professional actors. Mark Cousins writes:

So complete was Bresson’s rejection of cinema norms that he has a tendency to fall outside film history. However, his uncompromising stance has been extremely influential in some quarters.

Bresson's book Notes on the Cinematographer (1975) is one of the most respected books on film theory and criticism. His theories about film greatly influenced other filmmakers, particularly the French New Wave directors.

French cinema
Opposing the established pre-war French cinema (known as Tradition de la Qualité ["tradition of quality"]) by offering his own personal responses to the question "what is cinema?", and by formulating his ascetic style, Bresson gained a high reputation with the founders of the French New Wave. He is often listed (along with Alexandre Astruc and André Bazin) as one of the main figures who influenced them. New Wave pioneers praised Bresson and posited him as a prototype for or precursor to the movement. However, Bresson was neither as overtly experimental nor as outwardly political as the New Wave filmmakers, and his religious views (Catholicism and Jansenism) were not attractive to most of the filmmakers associated with the movement.

In his development of auteur theory, François Truffaut lists Bresson among the few directors to whom the term "auteur" can genuinely be applied, and later names him as one of the only examples of directors who could approach even the so-called "unfilmable" scenes, using the film narrative at its disposal. Jean-Luc Godard also looked upon Bresson with high admiration ("Robert Bresson is French cinema, as Dostoevsky is the Russian novel and Mozart is the German music.") Screenwriter and director Alain Cavalier describes Bresson's role as pivotal not only in the New Wave movement, but for French cinema in general, writing, "In French cinema you have a father and a mother: the father is Bresson and the mother is Renoir, with Bresson representing the strictness of the law and Renoir warmth and generosity. All the better French cinema has and will have to connect to Bresson in some way."

Reception and influence
Bresson has also influenced a number of other filmmakers, including Andrei Tarkovsky, Chantal Akerman, Jean Eustache, Abel Ferrara, Philippe Garrel, Hal Hartley, Monte Hellman, Jim Jarmusch, Louis Malle, Michael Haneke, Olivier Assayas, Atom Egoyan, the Dardenne brothers, Aki Kaurismäki, and Paul Schrader, whose book Transcendental Style in Film: Ozu, Bresson, Dreyer includes a detailed critical analysis.

The Swedish filmmaker Ingmar Bergman praised and admired Bresson's films such as Mouchette and Diary of a Country Priest. The French filmmaker Jean Cocteau held Bresson in high regard. The French filmmaker Alain Resnais was an strong admirer of Bresson and his work. The French filmmaker Jean-Pierre Melville was also fond of Bresson and his work. The French filmmaker Jacques Rivette has acknowledge to Bresson's influence on his films. The Polish filmmaker Krzysztof Kieślowski was also influenced by him and ranked Bresson's film, A Man Escaped as one of the top ten films that "affected" him the most. The German filmmaker Werner Herzog praised Bresson's films such as Pickpocket and Au Hasard Balthazar. The Hungarian filmmaker Béla Tarr was influenced by Bresson and listed Bresson film Au Hasard Balthazar on his top ten films of all time. The Iranian filmmaker Abbas Kiarostami was highly influenced by Bresson and mentioned the personal importance of Bresson's book, Notes on the Cinematographer. The Greek filmmaker Theo Angelopoulos listed Bresson's film Pickpocket on his top ten films of all time. The German filmmaker Rainer Werner Fassbinder was influenced by Bresson and championed and paid homage to Bresson's film The Devil Probably with his film The Third Generation. When Fassbinder was a member of the jury in the 1977 Berlin Film Festival, he even went so far as to threaten to leave the jury (when his enthusiasm was not shared by his peers) unless his appreciation for Bresson's film was made known to the public. The Dardenne brothers's film L'Enfant was influenced by Bresson's film Pickpocket. The German director Margarethe von Trotta lists Bresson as one of her favorite directors. The American filmmaker Wes Anderson listed Au Hasard Balthazar as one of his favorite films in the Criterion Collection library and called Bresson's film Mouchette, "terrific". The American filmmaker Richard Linklater was influenced by Bresson's work and listed Au hasard Balthazar and Pickpocket in his top 10 film list from the Criterion Collection. The British-American filmmaker Christopher Nolan was influenced by Bresson's films (specifically Pickpocket and A Man Escaped) for his film, Dunkirk. Benny Safdie named the Bresson's film A Man Escaped as his favorite film of all time. Martin Scorsese praised Bresson as "one of the cinema’s greatest artists" and an influence on his films such as Taxi Driver. Andrei Tarkovsky held Bresson in very high regard, noting him and Ingmar Bergman as his two favourite filmmakers, stating "I am only interested in the views of two people: one is called Bresson and one called Bergman". In his book Sculpting in Time, Tarkovsky describes Bresson as "perhaps the only artist in cinema, who achieved the perfect fusion of the finished work with a concept theoretically formulated beforehand."

Filmography

Feature films
As a Director

Short films
 Les affaires publiques (Public Affairs, 1934)

Bibliography
Notes sur le Cinématographe (1975)translated as Notes on Cinematography, Notes on the Cinematographer and Notes on the Cinematograph in different English editions.
Bresson on Bresson: Interviews, 1943-1983 (2016)translated from the French by Anna Moschovakis, edited by Mylène Bresson, preface by Pascal Mérigeau.

Awards and nominations

Cannes Film Festival

Berlin Film Festival

Venice Film Festival

Works on Bresson
 Robert Bresson: A Passion for Film by Tony Pipolo (Oxford University Press; 407 pages; 2010) pays particular attention to psychosexual aspects of the French filmmaker's 13 features, from Les Anges du péché (1943) to L'Argent (1983).
La politique des auteurs, edited by André Bazin.
Robert Bresson (Cinematheque Ontario Monographs, No. 2), edited by James Quandt
Transcendental Style in Film: Bresson, Ozu, Dreyer by Paul Schrader
Robert Bresson: A Spiritual Style in Film, by Joseph Cunneen
Robert Bresson, by Philippe Arnauld, Cahiers du cinéma, 1986
The Films of Robert Bresson, Ian Cameron (ed.), New York: Praeger Publishers, 1969.
Robert Bresson, by Keith Reader, Manchester University Press, 2000.
"Robert Bresson", a poem by Patti Smith from her 1978 book Babel
"Spiritual style in the films of Robert Bresson", a chapter in Susan Sontag's Against Interpretation and other essays, New York: Picador, 1966.
Robert Bresson (Revised), James Quandt (ed), Cinematheque Ontario Monographs, 2012 (752 pages)
Neither God Nor Master: Robert Bresson and Radical Politics by Brian Price (University of Minnesota Press, 2011, 264 pages).
Bresson on Bresson: Interviews, 1943–1983 by Robert Bresson, translated from the French by Anna Moschovakis, edited by Mylène Bresson, preface by Pascal Mérigeau (New York Review Books, 2016)
The Invention of Robert Bresson: The Auteur and His Market by Colin Burnett, Indiana University Press, 2016.

See also
 Robert Bresson Prize

References

External links
Informational

Robert-Bresson.com: Resource dedicated to Bresson's films 
A Bresson bibliography

Interviews
Interview with Bresson (1970)
Interview footage with Bresson from French TV in 1960
Inside Bresson's L'Argent: Interview with Crew-member Jonathan Hourigan, by Colin Burnett

 
1901 births
1999 deaths
Directors of Palme d'Or winners
Cannes Film Festival Award for Best Director winners
European Film Awards winners (people)
French film directors
French Roman Catholics
Jansenists
Lycée Lakanal alumni
People from Puy-de-Dôme
French prisoners of war in World War II
French-language film directors